In political science and popular discourse, the horseshoe theory asserts that the extreme left and the extreme right, rather than being at opposite and opposing ends of a linear political continuum, closely resemble each other, analogous to the way that the opposite ends of a horseshoe are close together.

The theory is attributed to the French philosopher and writer Jean-Pierre Faye. Proponents point to a number of perceived similarities between extremes and allege that both have a tendency to support authoritarianism or totalitarianism. Several political scientists have criticized the theory.

Origin 
The horseshoe metaphor was used as early as during the Weimar Republic to describe the ideology of the Black Front.

The later use of the term in political theory was seen in Jean-Pierre Faye's 2002 book Le Siècle des idéologies (The Century of Ideologies). Faye's book discussed the use of ideologies (he points out that "ideology" is a pair of Greek words that were joined in French) rooted in philosophy by totalitarian regimes with specific reference to Hitler, Nietzsche, Stalin, and Marx.

Others have attributed the theory as having come from the American sociologists Seymour Martin Lipset and Daniel Bell, as well as the Pluralist school. Because the theory is also popular in Germany, a co-contributor to the theory is said to be the German political scientist Eckhard Jesse.

Modern usage 
In a 2006 book, the American political scientist Jeff Taylor wrote: "It may be more useful to think of the Left and the Right as two components of populism, with elitism residing in the Center. The political spectrum may be linear, but it is not a straight line. It is shaped like a horseshoe." In the same year, the term was used in discussing a resurgent hostility toward Jews and a new antisemitism from both the extreme left and the extreme right.

In a 2008 essay, Josef Joffe, a visiting fellow at the conservative think tank the Hoover Institution, wrote:

Will globalization survive the gloom? The creeping revolt against globalization actually preceded the Crash of '08. Everywhere in the West, populism began to show its angry face at mid-decade. The two most dramatic instances were Germany and Austria, where populist parties scored big with a message of isolationism, protectionism and redistribution. In Germany, it was left-wing populism ("Die Linke"); in Austria it was a bunch of right-wing parties that garnered almost 30% in the 2008 election. Left and right together illustrated once more the "horseshoe" theory of modern politics: As the iron is bent backward, the two extremes almost touch.

In 2015, the reformist Muslim Maajid Nawaz invoked the horseshoe theory on lamenting a common tendency on both extremes toward the compiling and publishing of "lists of political foes;" he added:

As the political horseshoe theory attributed to Jean-Pierre Faye highlights, if we travel far-left enough, we find the very same sneering, nasty and reckless bully-boy tactics used by the far-right. The two extremes of the political spectrum end up meeting like a horseshoe, at the top, which to my mind symbolizes totalitarian control from above. In their quest for ideological purity, Stalin and Hitler had more in common than modern neo-Nazis and far-left agitators would care to admit.

In a 2018 article for Eurozine, "How Right Is the Left?", Kyrylo Tkachenko wrote about the common cause found recently between both extremes in Ukraine:

In a 2021 article for Reason, Katherine Mangu-Ward wrote:

The theory has also been quoted when referring to American far-right and far-left organisations both supporting Putin in the Russian invasion of Ukraine in 2022.

In December 2022, historian Kathleen Belew, in examining the "crunchy-to-alt-right pipeline" – connections between "natural-food-and-body community and white-power and militant-right online spaces" – wrote that an examination of documents connected with the white power movement indicated that a "horseshoe" is not quite right as a visual metaphor for the relationship of the far-left and the far-right, that, in fact, the archive showed that it was more like a circle, at least in the specific case she examined.

Criticism 
Horseshoe theory does not enjoy support within academic circles; peer-reviewed research by political scientists on the subject is scarce and existing studies have generally contradicted its central premises.

Chip Berlet has characterized the theory as an oversimplification of political ideologies, ignoring fundamental differences between them.

Paul H. P. Hanel, a research associate, wrote

Simon Choat, a senior lecturer in political theory at Kingston University, criticizes horseshoe theory from a leftist perspective. He argues that far-left and far-right ideologies only share similarities in the vaguest sense in that they both oppose the liberal democratic status quo; however, the two sides both have very different reasons and very different aims for doing so. Choat uses the issue of globalization as an example; both the far-left and the far-right attack neoliberal globalization and its elites, but have conflicting views on who those elites are and conflicting reasons for attacking them:

Choat also argues that although proponents of the horseshoe theory may cite examples of alleged history of collusion between fascists and communists, those on the far-left usually oppose the rise of far-right or fascist regimes in their countries. Instead, he argues that it has been centrists who have supported far-right and fascist regimes that they prefer in power over socialist ones.

While this formal academic analysis is fairly recent, criticism of horseshoe theory and its antecedents is long-standing, and a frequent basis for criticism has been the tendency of an observer from one position to group opposing movements together. As early as 1938, Marxist theorist and politician Leon Trotsky wrote:

See also 

 Argument to moderation
 Centrism
 Comparison of Nazism and Stalinism
 Fascist syndicalism
 Hemicycle
 Inglehart–Welzel cultural map of the world
 LaRouche movement
 Left–right political spectrum
 National Bolshevism
 Neutrality
 Nolan Chart
 Open–closed political spectrum
 Overton window
 The Political Compass
 Political spectrum
 Red-brown alliance
 Sorelianism
 Strasserism
 Syncretic politics
 Third Position

References

External links

Dichotomies
Political science
Political spectrum
Political science terminology